Kameshwar Baitha is a member of the 15th Lok Sabha of India. He represented the Palamu constituency of Jharkhand. He was originally a member of the Jharkhand Mukti Morcha political party, but joined the Bharatiya Janata Party in 2014. He left the BJP for the Trinamool Congress after failing to get a ticket for the general Elections of 2014.

Education and background

Kameshwar Baitha was born in a village in the Bishrampur block of the Palamu district (then part of Bihar). The highest educational qualification attained by Baitha is matriculation. During the 1970s, the rampant feudalism and the resulting marginalisation of the landless lower castes led to social unrest in Palamu and other parts of Bihar. Several low-caste people joined the Naxalite–Maoist insurgent groups. Baitha joined Party Unity in the late 1980s, after the Arwal massacre in which 21 supporters of the left-wing group Mazdoor Kisan Sangharsh Samiti (MKSS) were killed in police firing. As a Naxal insurgent, he commandeered the Koel-Sankh zone of the CPI (Maoist).

As a result of his Naxalite past, he is facing as many as 53 criminal cases in various courts that includes killing of 17 PAC jawans and divisional forest officer Sanjay Singh at Rehal village on Kaimur hills in Rohtas. He was the only jail inmate when selected as MP in 2009. Baitha denied his involvement in any violence, stating that he had never touched a weapon in his life during his "27 years of struggle for the people's cause."

Political career 

In 2009, Kameshwar Baitha won the Lok Sabha elections from Palamu, which is reserved for Scheduled Caste candidates. He had contested the elections on a JMM ticket, while lodged in a Bihar jail. He defeated Rashtriya Janata Dal's sitting MP Ghuran Ram. After winning the elections, he spent two years and 7 months in jail, getting bail in late 2011.

Baitha left JMM in 2014. He declared that he had joined the Bharatiya Janata Party (BJP), but BJP declined this and did not approve his membership. He then joined TMC, and was given a ticket for the 2014 Lok Sabha elections.

Posts held

See also

List of members of the 15th Lok Sabha of India
Politics of India
Parliament of India
Government of India

References

1956 births
Living people
India MPs 2009–2014
People from Palamu district
Lok Sabha members from Jharkhand
People from Garhwa district
Jharkhand Mukti Morcha politicians
Trinamool Congress politicians
Communist Party of India (Maoist) politicians